Megalorhipida is a genus of moths in the family Pterophoridae described by Hans Georg Amsel in 1935. Species in this genus are distributed in pantropical and subtropical climates. The species typically nests on host plants in the families Nyctaginaceae, Amaranthaceae, Fabaceae,
Goodeniaceae, Asteraceae, and Verbenaceae. The generic name is often misspelled as Megalorrhipida. The species formerly placed in the genus Antarches are now considered to belong to this genus.

Species
Megalorhipida angusta Arenberger, 2002
Megalorhipida deboeri Gielis, 2003
Megalorhipida dubiosa Gielis, 2006
Megalorhipida dulcis (Walsingham, 1915)
Megalorhipida fissa Arenberger, 2002
Megalorhipida gielisi Rose and Pooni, 2003
Megalorhipida leptomeres (Meyrick, 1886)
Megalorhipida leucodactyla (Fabricius, 1793)
Megalorhipida madoris Gielis & de Vos, 2007
Megalorhipida monsa  Bippus, 2020
Megalorhipida palaestinensis (Fabricius, 1793) (type)
Megalorhipida paradefectalis Rose and Pooni, 2003
Megalorhipida paraiso Gielis, 2006
Megalorhipida parvula Arenberger, 2010
Megalorhipida prolai (Gibeaux, 1994)
Megalorhipida pseudodefectalis (Gielis, 1989)
Megalorhipida tessmanni (Strand, 1912)
Megalorhipida vivax (Meyrick, 1909)

References

Oxyptilini
Pantropical fauna
Taxa named by Hans Georg Amsel
Moth genera